Lez Beckett is a hip hop artist. He has been a member of South West Syndicate and Cypher Duem. He won a Deadly in 2005 for Most Promising New Talent.

References

External links
Video Bio

Living people
Australian male rappers
Year of birth missing (living people)